Izanami is a genus of crabs in the family Matutidae, containing the following species:
 Izanami curtispina (Sakai, 1961)
 Izanami reticulata  Müller & Galil, 1998

References

Calappoidea